Iván Werning (born June 20, 1974) is an Argentine economist. He is a professor at the MIT Department of Economics.

A native of Argentina, Werning earned his B.A. from Universidad de San Andrés and his M.A. from Universidad Torcuato di Tella, both in Buenos Aires. Werning earned his Ph.D. at the University of Chicago in 2002.

In the article "International bright young things" on 30 October 2008, The Economist listed Werning as one of the top 8 young economists in the world.

References

External links
 Website at MIT

1974 births
Living people
21st-century Argentine economists
University of Chicago alumni
MIT School of Humanities, Arts, and Social Sciences faculty
Fellows of the Econometric Society
Fellows of the American Academy of Arts and Sciences